John McNeil (born 12 February 1959 in Greenock) is a Scottish former professional footballer who played as a right winger.

Career
McNeil signed professional forms with Morton in 1975 and played over 400 games for the Greenock side. Apart from a one-game loan spell with Dundee United in 1982 and two weeks on loan at Arsenal at the end of 1982–83 (in which he played in 6 Football Combination reserve games, scoring 2 goals, between 28 April and 9 May), McNeil spent his entire career with Morton over fifteen years, retiring in 1991.

In January 2008, McNeil was believed to be working for IBM.

Personal life
John's son David McNeil made his debut for Morton in August 2013. After scoring on his debut, David went on to make 21 appearances scoring twice before leaving the club in 2015.

Honours
Greenock Morton
Scottish Football League First Division: 1977–78, 1983–84, 1986–87

Notes

References

External links
 

1959 births
Living people
Footballers from Greenock
Scottish footballers
Association football wingers
Greenock Morton F.C. players
Dundee United F.C. players
Scottish Football League players
Arsenal F.C. players